Condemned, a 1984 Filipino film, depicts the cruelty of big-city life, with a focus on Manila. The plot centers on the corruption of society and abuses of power.  The film was directed by Mario O'Hara, and the screenplay was written by Jose Javier Reyes and Frank Rivera. The film received an "A" review from the Film Ratings Board.

Plot
Yolly (Nora Aunor), a flower vendor, her brother Efren (Dan Alvaro), a driver and hired gun for a ruthless gangster, and Connie (Gloria Romero) live a bleak existence in the underbelly of the fashionable tourist district of Manila. Escaping from a violent past, the siblings' world collides with Connie's gang.

Cast
Nora Aunor as Yolly
Dan Alvaro as Efren
Gloria Romero as Connie
Gina Alajar as Mayette
Rio Locsin as Lorraine
Ricky Davao as Joey
Sonny Parsons as Elmo
Leni Santos as Nona
Connie Angeles as Cita
Toby Alejar as Dennis
Alicia Alonzo as Yolly's Mother
Romnick Sarmenta as Young Efren

Critical reception

"Condemned is a rich brew of sudden violence, baroque cruelty, and sardonic dark humor." - Noel Vera, film critic

References

External links 
 

Philippine propaganda films
Philippine black-and-white films
1984 films
Filipino-language films
Philippine drama films
Film noir
Films directed by Mario O'Hara